Distractions are processes of diverting the attention of an individual or group from a desired area of focus.

Distractions may also refer to:

Music
 The Distractions, a new wave band from Manchester
 Distractions (album), a 2021 album by Tindersticks
 Distractions (The Loved Ones EP), 2009 
 Distractions (Regurgitator EP), 2010
 Distractions, a 2006 album by the RH Factor, with band leader Roy Hargrove
 "Distractions", a song by Paul McCartney from the 1989 album  Flowers in the Dirt
 "Distractions", a 2006 song by bravecaptain

Television
 "Distractions" (Heroes), a 2007 episode of the television series Heroes
 "Distractions" (House), a 2006 episode of the television series House

See also 
 Distraction (disambiguation)